For the Defense may refer to:

 For the Defense (1916 film), an American drama film starring Fannie Ward
 For the Defense (1922 film), an American mystery film featuring Ethel Clayton and Vernon Steele
 For the Defense (1930 film), an American crime/romantic drama film starring William Powell and Kay Francis